David Wylie (born 4 April 1966, in Johnstone) is a Scottish former football goalkeeper.

After retiring as a player, Wylie remained registered as the fourth-choice goalkeeper for Greenock Morton, where he was the goalkeeping coach, for a number of years due to a constant stream of injuries to goalkeepers at the club.

Career

Wylie spent 13 years at Greenock Morton, making over 500 appearances and winning two league titles (First and Second Division). During the 1986–87 season, Wylie was involved in the Scotland u21 squad, but did not make any appearances for them. He then had spells at Clyde (where he won another Second Division championship medal), Clydebank and Gretna.

His only spell out of senior football saw him spend the 2001–02 season at Renfrewshire junior side, Renfrew.

He returned to Morton as a goalkeeping coach, a role which he also performed at St Mirren whilst he was playing for Renfrew. He featured on the bench as a trialist against Ayr United in 2009 due to injuries to Kevin Cuthbert, Colin Stewart and Bryn Halliwell. Due to rules on trialists in the Scottish League Cup, Wylie had to be re-registered as a player for the second round defeat to Kilmarnock.

Wylie also has further coaching experience from when he was appointed as the goalkeeping coach at St Mirren in 2000.

Honours

Greenock Morton
Scottish Football League First Division: 1986–87
Scottish Football League Second Division: 1994–95

Clyde
Scottish Second Division: 1999–00

See also
 List of footballers in Scotland by number of league appearances (500+)

References

External links

Living people
1966 births
People from Johnstone
Greenock Morton F.C. players
Clyde F.C. players
Clydebank F.C. (1965) players
Greenock Morton F.C. non-playing staff
Gretna F.C. players
Scottish footballers
Scottish Football League players
Association football goalkeepers
Scottish Junior Football Association players
Renfrew F.C. players
Footballers from Renfrewshire